

Heinrich-Hermann von Hülsen (8 July 1895 – 6 June 1982) was a decorated Generalmajor in the Wehrmacht during World War II, who commanded two armoured divisions. Hülsen commanded the 44th Reconnaissance Battalion of 44th Infantry Division into the Invasion of Poland at the beginning of World War II, and led this unit until 5 December 1939. He then served as Adjutant in the high command of 1st Army until 1 April 1941, and was promoted to Oberst on 1 December 1940 during this service. On 1 April 1941 he took command of the 2nd Mounted Regiment, which he led into Operation Barbarossa, until he was called back into reserve on 1 December 1941, and was awarded the German Cross in Gold on 2 November 1941.

On 25 May 1942 he took command of the 9th Rifle Brigade under 9. Panzer-Division, which he led in the southern theater of the Eastern Front until 5 July 1942. Taking command of the 9th Panzer Grenadier Regiment until 15 December 1942, he was also named temporary commander of 9. Panzer-Division from 27 July until 3 August 1943 during this service.

Called back into reserve on 15 December 1942, he next took command of 21. Panzer-Division on 25 April 1943 in North Africa. After having been promoted to Generalmajor on 1 May 1943, on 13 May 1943 he was captured by British forces in the area of Tunis, Tunisia, and was in captivity until 17 February 1947. From late summer 1944, von Hülsen was interned in Clinton, Mississippi.

Awards and decorations
 Iron Cross (1914)
 Honour Cross of the World War 1914/1918
 Iron Cross (1939)
 German Cross in Gold (2 November 1941)

References

1895 births
1982 deaths
Major generals of the German Army (Wehrmacht)
Recipients of the clasp to the Iron Cross, 1st class
Recipients of the Gold German Cross
Reichswehr personnel
Military personnel from Weimar